The 2018–19 James Madison Dukes men's basketball team represented James Madison University during the 2018–19 NCAA Division I men's basketball season. The Dukes, led by third-year head coach Louis Rowe, played their home games at the James Madison University Convocation Center in Harrisonburg, Virginia as members of the Colonial Athletic Association.

Previous season 
The Dukes finished the 2017–18 season 10–22, 6–12 in CAA play to finish in a four-way tie for seventh place. They lost in the first round of the CAA tournament to Drexel.

Departures

Recruiting

Recruiting class of 2019

Roster 

}

Honors and awards

Lindy's Sports Preseason All Conference 2nd Team  
Stuckey Mosley

Athlon Sports Preseason All CAA 2nd Team  
Stuckey Mosley

Schedule and results

|-
!colspan=9 style=| Non-conference regular season

|-
!colspan=9 style=| CAA regular season

|-
!colspan=9 style=| CAA tournament

Source:

References

James Madison Dukes men's basketball seasons
James Madison
James Madison
James Madison